was a river gunboat of the Imperial Japanese Navy, part of the 11th Gunboat Sentai, that operated on the Yangtze River in China during the 1930s, and during the Second Sino-Japanese War.

On 13 December 1937, Hira and other IJN ships engaged Chinese positions at Xiaguan, China and attacked Chinese boats and rafts on the Yangtze River. On 17 August 1944 Hira was damaged by US 14th Air Force aircraft at Kiukiang, China. On 26 November 1944 Hira and the gunboat Hozu ran aground near Anking, China. Chinese aircraft subsequently bombed and sunk Hozu and severely damaged Hira. Hira was scrapped in July 1945.

Sources 
 Japanese gunboats (with photos) 
 Vessels of the IJN
 Monograph 144 Chapter II

References 

Seta-class gunboats
Second Sino-Japanese War naval ships of Japan
Maritime incidents in December 1944
Shipwrecks of China
Ships built by Mitsubishi Heavy Industries